The General Union of the Workers of São Tomé and Príncipe (UGT/STP) is a national trade union center in São Tomé and Príncipe.

The UGT/STP is affiliated with the International Trade Union Confederation.

References

External links
 UGT/STP at the UGT.

Trade unions in São Tomé and Príncipe
International Trade Union Confederation